"Luca$" is the seventeenth episode of the twenty-fifth season of the American animated television series The Simpsons and the 547th episode of the series. It first aired on the Fox network in the United States on April 6, 2014. It was written by Carolyn Omine and directed by Chris Clements. In the episode, Marge thinks that Lisa is dating below her standards when she brings home a competitive eater-in-training named Lucas Bortner, so she enlists Homer to help Lisa explore other options. Meanwhile, Bart receives gifts from Snake Jailbird for helping him get out of a jam, but when a betrayal from Milhouse sends Snake back to prison, Bart hatches a plan to get him out.

Plot
The episode begins at a playground, where Homer has fallen asleep while stuck in the jungle gym's giant metal spiral. Marge drops Bart and Lisa off at school, who are hiding in the back seat, so they can preserve their reputations. Homer's story is shown in flashback form, and when he finishes, the jungle gym falls over into a puddle. Bart is later seen in Principal Skinner's office, giving an alibi on why he was tardy. Skinner decides to pursue corporal punishment, and while he's distracted with Groundskeeper Willie, Bart makes a run for it. Bart manages to escape Skinner, whose car accidentally reverses into the auto shop. Bart takes refuge in his treehouse, where he discovers that Snake Jailbird is hiding there. He reveals he is committing crimes to help his son Jeremy. Chief Wiggum arrives, thinking Snake is there, so Bart lies that Snake made it to the top of Mount Springfield. Back at school, Lisa sees a boy choking on pizza. She performs the Heimlich maneuver on him, reveals his name is Lucas Bortner, and he's a competitive eater. She doesn't think that competitive eating is for him, and suddenly gets a crush on him. She then thinks about changing him. Meanwhile, Snake, grateful for Bart's actions, steals a PlayStadium 4 and leaves it in Bart's room.

Milhouse suspects something, and finds out his items were stolen. Lucas arrives at the Simpsons' house, and for a short while, draws the attention of Homer after hearing "competitive eater". Lucas suggests a variety of foods to Lisa including Vienna sausage, blueberry pie, oatmeal, free-style baked beans, catfish and cow brain. Disgusted by the cow brain, Lisa picks the beans. Inside the house, Patty and Selma start insulting Lucas, and compares him to Homer. Marge is surprised her daughter likes Lucas. Meanwhile, Bart starts receiving more stolen items from Snake, including a Tiger and a Knight's Armor, Sword and Shield. Lisa suggests that Lucas eat ice cream, but he gets brain freeze from it. He instructs Lisa to kick him on the head. Marge, who is eavesdropping on it, believes Lisa is going to marry Lucas and ruin her future.

Bart goes up to the treehouse, where he finds out Snake has stolen Milhouse's myPad. Milhouse confronts Bart and demands that Bart tell how Bart is getting all the free items. Bart initially tries to distract Milhouse by playing him the music from Osmos, however Milhouse demands to be told. Bart reveals that it is Snake, and Milhouse reveals Snake to the authorities, who vow to execute him in an electric chair. Marge suggests to Homer that he take Lisa on a dinner date. She tells him to act like a gentleman, so she'll want the same from her future husband. Marge awkwardly tries to deny that having a husband like Homer would be bad for Lisa, but Homer quickly realizes she's lying to him. He gets angry and leaves to sleep on Flanders' couch, stating that the Simpsons' couch "is crap".

At Moe's Tavern, Homer finally works up the courage to ask Lisa out for dinner, and she accepts. Meanwhile, Bart cycles to the police station and explains Snake's story in the hope he might be pardoned. Wiggum rejects Bart's plea, but Snake escapes anyway. Homer gets ready for his dinner with Lisa and sarcastically vows not to embarrass Marge, but is still resentful about how she perceives him, and Marge looks dejected when he makes his anger clear. At the Gilded Truffle, Homer is on his best behavior and asks for vegetarian lasagna (although he requests it be covered with cow blood). Marge shows up and tries to apologize for her actions. He forgives her when she reveals she's wearing a sexy purple dress she bought after selling the sewing machine. She leaves Homer and Lisa to continue their date and waits at the restaurant bar, where Jimbo starts hitting on her. The next day at school, Lisa discovers that Lucas quit competitive eating and decided to do "what Adele does". Then, she tries to teach him how to whistle, but he fails, although he thinks he's whistling.

Reception
Dennis Perkins of The A.V. Club gave the episode a C, saying "Again, the resolution to the central plot is, by turns, lazy, gross, and inadequately developed. If The Simpsons is to be judged on its own merits, without referring to its past glories, fine—based solely on this episode, this isn’t a show I’d tune in to every week."

The episode received a 1.9 rating and was watched by a total of 4.30 million people, making it the second most watched show on Animation Domination that night.

References

External links 
 
 "Luca$" at theSimpsons.com

2014 American television episodes
The Simpsons (season 25) episodes
Television episodes written by Carolyn Omine